Róbert Döme (born January 29, 1979) is a Slovak former professional ice hockey right winger who played in the National Hockey League (NHL) with the Pittsburgh Penguins and the Calgary Flames.

Playing career
Döme played in the 1992 and 1993 Quebec International Pee-Wee Hockey Tournaments with a youth ice hockey team from Bratislava.

After playing three seasons in the International Hockey League, Döme was drafted 17th overall in the 1997 NHL Entry Draft by the Pittsburgh Penguins.  He appeared in 30 games with the Penguins in the 1997–98 season, and 22 more in the 1999–2000 season.  He made his most recent NHL appearance in the 2002–03 season, playing in one game with the Calgary Flames.

Döme has played in Europe since 2003, playing two seasons with Södertälje SK of the Swedish Elite League and the 2005–06 season with the Nürnberg Ice Tigers of Germany's DEL. In July 2006 he signed a two-year contract with Modo Hockey of the Swedish Elite League where he became a Swedish champion in the season of 2006/2007. Received an award as the “Modo player with the largest heart for the spectators” during the celebrations at the town square the day after he brought the gold to Modo and Örnsköldsvik.

Döme played as a captain for HC Slovan Bratislava in the Slovnaft Extraliga from the season 2007–08. Slovan Bratislava went on to win Slovnaft Extraliga that year.

Döme played six games with HC Dukla Senica of Slovak 1.Liga, a second-tier league below Slovnaft Extraliga, during the 2009–10 season. He scored one goal and five points in six games played.

Döme retired in 2010 and as now works as a scout.

Career statistics

Regular season and playoffs

International

Awards and accomplishments
1995–96: Turner Cup Champion (as a member of the Utah Grizzlies)
2006–07: Elitserien Champion (as a member of Modo Hockey)
2007–08: Slovnaft Extraliga Champion (as a member of HC Slovan Bratislava)

References

External links

1979 births
Calgary Flames players
Rytíři Kladno players
HC Oceláři Třinec players
HC Slovan Bratislava players
Houston Aeros (1994–2013) players
Las Vegas Thunder players
Living people
Long Beach Ice Dogs (IHL) players
Lowell Lock Monsters players
Modo Hockey players
National Hockey League first-round draft picks
Nürnberg Ice Tigers players
Pittsburgh Penguins draft picks
Pittsburgh Penguins players
Saint John Flames players
Slovak expatriate ice hockey players in Germany
Slovak ice hockey right wingers
Södertälje SK players
Syracuse Crunch players
Utah Grizzlies (IHL) players
Wilkes-Barre/Scranton Penguins players
Sportspeople from Senica
Slovak expatriate ice hockey players in the United States
Slovak expatriate ice hockey players in Canada
Slovak expatriate ice hockey players in the Czech Republic
Slovak expatriate ice hockey players in Sweden